Rod Sanderson Visser is a Canadian former politician. Visser served as a BC Liberal Member of the Legislative Assembly of British Columbia from 2001 to 2005, representing the riding of North Island.

Electoral results

References

External links
Rod Visser

British Columbia Liberal Party MLAs
1964 births
Living people
People from Campbell River, British Columbia
21st-century Canadian politicians